The filmography of actress Margot Kidder includes over 100 credits in film and television, and spans a total of 50 years. Kidder began her career in her native Canada appearing in small independent films and on Canadian television series, before being cast opposite Beau Bridges in the period comedy Gaily, Gaily (1969). She subsequently starred opposite Gene Wilder in Quackser Fortune Has a Cousin in the Bronx (1970), and in 1972 she had a role in the movie The Bounty Man with Clint Walker, followed by a dual lead role in Brian De Palma's cult thriller film Sisters (1972), and a supporting part in the slasher film Black Christmas (1974). The following year, she co-starred with Robert Redford in the drama The Great Waldo Pepper.

Kidder came to mainstream recognition for her iconic role as Lois Lane in Richard Donner's Superman (1978); she would go on to reprise the role in the film's following three sequels. She garnered additional mainstream recognition for her role as Kathy Lutz in the blockbuster horror film The Amityville Horror (1979).

After a highly publicized nervous breakdown in 1996, Kidder appeared mainly in independent films throughout the 1990s and early-2000s. In 2004, she guest-starred as Bridgette Crosby on the network series Smallville, and also had guest role on the Showtime series The L Word (2006), and the ABC series Brothers & Sisters (2007). In 2014, Kidder won a Daytime Emmy Award for her appearance in R.L. Stine's The Haunting Hour. Kidder died in 2018, with her final film credit while she was still alive being the independent Canadian film The Neighborhood (2017). She appeared posthumously in the film Puppy Swap Love Unleashed and will appear posthumously in Robber's Roost, the latter which is her final film role.

Film

Television

Stage

References

Sources

External links
 

Actress filmographies
American filmographies
Canadian filmographies